Minsk World was a military theme park located in Dapeng Bay, Shatoujiao, Shenzhen, Guangdong, China. It includes the former Soviet (later Russian) aircraft carrier Minsk, redesigned as a tourist attraction. The theme park opened on 10 May 2000. As of 2005, it had attracted more than five million visitors and generated 450 million yuan in revenue. The park closed in February 2016 and the aircraft carrier was moved to Zhoushan for repairs, after which it would be moved to another theme park in Nantong, Jiangsu.

History
The aircraft carrier Minsk was part of the Soviet Pacific Fleet. It had to be retired as a result of a major accident which could only be repaired at Chernomorski's facility, located in the newly independent Ukraine. In 1995 it was sold to a South Korean businessman, and later resold to Shenzhen Minsk Aircraft Carrier Industry Co. Ltd., a Chinese company. Until 2006, when the company went bankrupt, Minsk was the centrepiece of a military theme park in Shatoujiao district, Shenzhen called Minsk World. The aircraft carrier was put up for auction on 22 March 2006. No bids at the starting price of 128 million RMB were received, so the carrier was withdrawn from sale.

On 31 May 2006, the ship was auctioned off in Shenzhen for 128 million RMB to CITIC Shenzhen, which operated the carrier as the CITIC Minsk World military theme park. The ship was painted with the hull number 015, matching the Chinese Navy's first aircraft carrier Liaoning (16).

After a decline in visitor numbers, the park closed in 2016 when the local government decided to reclaim land in the area. The aircraft carrier was moved to Zhoushan for repairs, after which it will be moved to another theme park in Nantong, Jiangsu.

Facilities
In addition to the island, four of the carrier's decks including the flight deck and hangar deck were able to be visited. Various aspects of the Minsk, such as its living quarters and armament, were set up as exhibits. The staff were dressed in mock military uniforms, while regular choreographed musical performances were held on the flight and hangar decks. It was also possible to take a quick ride around the starboard side of the Minsk via motorboat.

In 2006, Chinese filmmaker Cheng Xiaoxing made a documentary about "Minsk World", broadcast on Arte TV.

Static display
There were a number of military aircraft and armaments on display on the deck and on the mainland area:

 MiG-23
 Mi-24
 Mikoyan MiG-27
 Yakovlev Yak-38
 SA-N-3
 53-65 torpedo
 AK-630

Gallery

See also
List of parks in Shenzhen

References

External links

 More photos from Minsk World Theme park
 Aircraft carrier used as Chinese theme park sets sail for new home
Video of Minsk World in operation

2000 establishments in China
Amusement parks in Shenzhen
Defunct amusement parks
Yantian District
2016 disestablishments in China